Kevin Durr (born March 13, 1991) is an American soccer player.

Career

Youth and College
Durr was part of the Bayer Leverkusen youth system as well as Bayern Munich and FC Garmisch-Partenkirchen before moving to the U.S. and spending his college career at the United States Air Force Academy.  He made a total of 78 appearances for the Falcons and tallied 18 goals and 18 assists.

Professional
On January 22, 2013, Durr was selected 16th overall in the 2013 MLS Supplemental Draft by Seattle Sounders FC.  However, he was cut from camp due to his Air Force commitment.

On March 26, 2015, Durr signed a professional contract with USL expansion side Colorado Springs Switchbacks FC.  He made his professional debut for the club on April 4 in a 2–1 defeat to Oklahoma City Energy FC. Durr ended his first season with the Colorado Springs Switchbacks FC making 11 appearances.

On January 25, 2016 it was announced that Durr had resigned with the Colorado Springs Switchbacks FC for the 2016 USL Pro season.

References

External links
Switchbacks FC bio
Air Force Falcons bio

1991 births
Living people
American soccer players
Air Force Falcons men's soccer players
Colorado Springs Switchbacks FC players
Association football midfielders
United States Air Force Academy alumni
Seattle Sounders FC draft picks
USL Championship players